Entiinae is a subfamily of the chalcid wasp family Eulophidae. It was formerly better known as the Euderinae but this name was determined to be a junior homonym. It consists of 18 genera.

References

Eulophidae
Hymenoptera subfamilies